Cordis, Hong Kong, formerly the Langham Place Hotel, is a five star hotel located at 555 Shanghai Street, Mong Kok, Hong Kong. It is operated by Langham Hotels International.

History
The hotel was built as part of an urban renewal project with three main elements: Langham Place shopping centre, hotel, and Langham Place Hotel. It was a joint venture development by the Great Eagle Group and the Urban Renewal Authority (URA).

Started in 1988, the project cost  and was completed in 2004. Several city blocks were demolished to make way for the project, including the old "Bird Street" at Hong Lok Street, home to many grassroots birdsellers.

On 26 August 2015, the Langham Place Hotel was rebranded as the Cordis, Hong Kong.

Facilities
The hotel has 664 guest rooms and four restaurants, including the two-Michelin-starred Chinese restaurant, Ming Court, awarded in the 2009 Hong Kong and Macau edition of the Michelin Guide.

The hotel has a collection of more than 1,500 pieces of contemporary Chinese art, which includes pieces by Wang Guangyi, Yue Minjun and Jiang Shuo.

It was also recognised as a "Best Five Star Hotel" by Travel Weekly Asia Magazine in 2007.

In 2010, Ming Court was listed with the 'Best seafood' and their garoupa and rice in lotus leaf dish as the 'Best Rice' on the Hong Kong Best Eats 2010 list compiled by CNN Travel.

Viral marketing controversy
In order to promote its hotels, the management hired Prosperity Research to produce a series of virals for an Internet social network campaign entitled 'Big Deal'. The videos were criticised for being poorly executed, and for making humour at the expense of local culture. The hotel management in response terminated its relationship with the company after its third video was published, removed the videos and apologised following negative response on Twitter LHI pulled the campaign due to "the potential to magnify the tone in a direction that was not intended." The group said the campaign was a "valuable lesson in communicating cultural differences in the social marketing environment and understanding the power social media holds."

References

External links
 
 

Hotels in Hong Kong
Landmarks in Hong Kong
Mong Kok
Skyscraper hotels in Hong Kong